The 2018 Annual King's Cup Football Tournament, commonly referred to as 2018 King's Cup, was the 46th King's Cup, the annual international men's football tournament organised by Football Association of Thailand. It was  held in Bangkok, Thailand, from 22 to 25 March 2018.

As hosts, Thailand participated automatically in the tournament; they were joined by the African  team Gabon, the Asian team United Arab Emirates and the European team Slovakia.

Participating teams
The following teams have participated for the tournament.

1 FIFA Ranking as of 15 February 2018.

Background

2018 FIFA World Cup Qualifying

Previous King's Cup

Venue
All matches held at the Rajamangala National Stadium in Bangkok, Thailand.

Squads

Matches
All times are local, Indochina Time (UTC+7)

Match rules
90 minutes.
Penalty shoot-out after a draw in 90 minutes.
Maximum of three substitutions.

Bracket

Semi-finals

Third place play-off

Final

Winners

Final ranking

Broadcasting rights

References

External links
Football Association of Thailand – FAT official site
Football Association of Thailand – FIFA site
Regulations Governing International Matches

King's Cup
2018 in Thai football cups
March 2018 sports events in Thailand
2018 in Thai football
Sports competitions in Bangkok